This page is a list of noteworthy Punjabi authors, who were born or lived in the Punjab, or who write in the Punjabi language.

Chronological list

The Beginning Of Punjabi Literature 
First and the foremost poems of Punjabi language was of Nath-Yogi in origin.

12th century
 Fariduddin Ganjshakar (1173–1266)

15th- 16th century
 Guru Nanak (15 April 1469 - 22 Sept 1539)

16th century
 Bhai Gurdas (1551–1636)
 Damodar Das Arora

17th century
 Sultan Bahu (1628–1691)
 Bhai Nand Lal (1633–1713)
 Bhai Mani Singh (1366–1737)
 Bulleh Shah (1680–1757)

18th century
 Waris Shah (1722–1798)
 Hashim (1735–1843)
 Shah Mohammad (1780–1862)
 Ratan Singh Bhangu (died 1846)

19th century
 Pundit Tara Singh (1822–1891)
 Shardha Ram Phillauri (1837–1881)
 Kahn Singh Nabha (1861–1938)
 Akali Kaur Singh (1866–1953)
 Bhai Vir Singh (1872–1957)
 Kripa Sagar (1875–1939)
 Dhani Ram Chatrik (1876–1954)
 Bhai Randhir Singh (1878–1961)
 Puran Singh(1881–1931)
 Bhai Jodh Singh (1882–1981)
 Sahib Singh (1892–1977)
 Gurbaksh Singh Preetlari (1895–1977)
 Nanak Singh (1897–1971)
 Jaswant Singh (Khoji) ( -1999)

20th century
 Partap Singh (1904–1984)
 Bhagat Puran Singh (1904–1992)
 Mohan Singh (1905–1978)
 Sujan Singh (1909–1993)
 Gurbachan Singh Talib (1911–1986)
 Gurdas Ram Alam (1912-1989)
 Balraj Sahni (1913–1973)
 Harcharan Singh (1914-2006)
 Sharif Kunjahi (1915–2007) 
 Balwant Gargi (1916–2003)
 Kartar Singh Duggal (1917–2012)
 Amrita Pritam (1919–2005)
 Jaswant Singh Kanwal (1919–2020)
 Harbhajan Singh (1920–2002)
 Santokh Singh Dhir (1920–2010)
 Kulwant Singh Virk (1921–1987)
 Ajit Saini (1922–2007)
 Sukhbir (1925–2012)
 Alam Lohar (1928–1979)
 Jaswant Singh Rahi (1930–1996)
 Gurdial Singh (1933-2016)
 Buta Singh (1934–)
 Giani Sant Singh Maskeen (1934–2005)
 Anwar Masood (1935–)
 Dalip Kaur Tiwana (1935–2020)
 Dalbir Chetan (5 April 1944– 1 January 2005)
 Shiv Kumar Batalvi (1937–1973)
 Karnail Singh Somal (1940–)
 Lal Singh Dil (1943–2007)
 Narinder Singh Kapoor (1944–)
 Surjit Paatar (1945–)
 Chaman Lal (1947–)
 Harjinder Singh Dilgeer (1962–)
 Avtar Singh Sandhu (Paash) (1950–1988)
Dr Amarjit Singh Tanda(1953–)
 Mir Tanha Yousafi (1955–)
 Gurdas Maan (1957–)
 Rupinderpal Singh Dhillon (1969-)
 Satinder Sartaj (1982-)

Alphabetical list

A
 Shri Guru Arjan Dev ji ( 1563-June 1606 )
 Akali Kaur Singh Nihang (1866–1953)
 Amrita Pritam (1919–2005)
 Ajit Saini (1922–2007)
 Alam Lohar (1928–1979)
 Anwar Masood (1935–)
 Avtar Singh Sandhu (Paash) (1950–1988)
 Sardar Amardeep Singh Gill (1968–20XX) Film Director, Writer, Lyricist and a Poet from Bathinda, Punjab, India

B
 Balraj Sahni (1913–1973)
 Balwant Gargi (1916–2003)
 Bulleh Shah (1680–1757)
 Buta Singh (1934–2021)

C
 Chaman Lal (1947–)

D
 Dalbir Chetan (5 April 1944– 1 January 2005)
 Dalip Kaur Tiwana (1935–2020)
 Damodar Das Arora
 Dhani Ram Chatrik (1876–1954)

F
 Fariduddin Ganjshakar (1173–1266)

G
 Gorakh Nath (ca. 10th century)
 Gurbachan Singh Talib (1911–1986)
 Gurdas Ram Alam (1912-1989)
 Gurbaksh Singh Preetlari (1895–1977)
 Gurmukh Singh Jeet (1922- 1993)
 Bhai Gurdas (1551–1636)
 Gurdial Singh (1933-2016)
 Gurdas Maan (1957-)

H
 Harbhajan Singh (1920–2002)
 Harjinder Singh Dilgeer (1947–)
 Hashim (1735–1843)
 Harcharan Singh (1914-2006)

J
 Jagtar Singh Randhawa (Advocate) (1968–)
 Jaswant Singh Kanwal (1919–)
 Jaswant Singh Rahi (1930–1996)
 Bhai Jodh Singh (1882–1981)
 Jaswant Singh (Khoji) (- 1999)

K
 Karnail Singh Somal (1940–)
 Kartar Singh Duggal (1917–2012)
 Kahn Singh Nabha (1861–1938)
 Kripa Sagar (1875–1939)
 Kulwant Singh Virk (1921–1987)

L
 Lal Singh Dil (1943–2007)

M
 Bhai Mani Singh (1666–1737)
 Mir Tanha Yousafi (1955–)
 Mohan Singh (1905–1978)

N
 Guru Nanak Dev ji (15 April 1469- 22 Sept. 1539)
 Bhai Nand Lal (1633–1713)
 Nanak Singh (1897–1971)

P
 Partap Singh (1904–1984)
 Bhagat Puran Singh (1904–1992)
 Puran Singh(1881–1931)
 Pundit Tara Singh (1822–1891)

R
 Bhai Randhir Singh (1878–1961)
 Ratan Singh Bhangu (died 1846)
 Rupinderpal Singh Dhillon (1969–)
 Rupinder Inderjit (2011–)

S
 Sahib Singh (1892–1977)
 Sahib Singh Arshi (born 1945)
 Sohan Singh Seetal (1909-1998) Poet, Novelist, historian, Authored more than 60 books
 Santokh Singh Dhir (1920–2010)
 Giani Sant Singh Maskeen (1934–2005)
 Sharif Kunjahi (1915–2007) 
 Shah Mohammad (1780–1862)
 Shiv Kumar Batalvi (1937–1973)
 Sujan Singh (1909–1993)
 Sultan Bahu (1628–1691)
 Surjit Paatar (1945–)
 Shardha Ram Phillauri (1837–1881)
 Sukhbir (1925–2012)
 Sarita Skagnes

V
 Bhai Vir Singh (1872–1957)

W
 Waris Shah (1722–1798)
 Waryam Singh Sandhu (1945–)

Y
 Yogesh Grover (1985–)

See also
 Lists of authors
 List of Punjabi poets

References

Lists of Indian writers
Authors

Punjabi literature
Lists of writers by language